Jerzy Nos of Topór was a mediaeval Polish-Lithuanian nobleman. Originally a starost of Drohiczyn and Mielnik, with time he rose to the rank of Prince of Polesia and governor of Pskov. He also held numerous posts in the administration of the Grand Duchy of Lithuania.

Little is known of his early life, though he was most likely a descendant of the Ruthenised Pinsk branch of the Gediminids.

During the 1406-1408 war fought by Grand Duke Vytautas against his son-in-law Vasili I of Moscow and Švitrigaila, Nos apparently fought for the earlier side. A major stand-off at Ugra River between the two armies ended without a battle in the Treaty of Ugra, by which Velikiy Novgorod was granted to Jogaila's brother Simeon Lingwen, and the important city of Pskov to Jerzy Nos, who acted as Jogaila's envoy.

Following the death of Grand Duke Vytautas, in 1432 Nos briefly served as the commander-in-chief of Lithuanian forces loyal to Švitrigaila and took part in the successful siege of the city of Lutsk.

References

Citations

Bibliography

  
  
  
  
  
  

Year of birth missing
Year of death missing
15th-century Polish people
Polish politicians